KRIK (100.5 MHz) is an F.M. radio station licensed to Refugio, Texas.  KRIK is owned by Hispanic Target Media, Inc..  It was assigned the KRIK callsign on September 2, 2009.

F.C.C. troubles
On January 8, 2014, F.C.C. inspectors showed up at the studios to find no staff present, in violation of F.C.C. regulations.

External links

References

Radio stations established in 2010
RIK